UGWA may refer to:

United Garment Workers of America, a defunct United States labor union
Upper Guyandotte Watershed Association, an environmental not for profit corporation